Primula cusickiana is a species of flowering plant in the primrose family known by the common name Cusick's primrose. It is native to the western United States in and around the Great Basin. Its distribution extends into Oregon, Idaho, Nevada, and Utah.

There are four varieties of this species:
P. c. var. cusickiana occurs in Oregon, Idaho, and Nevada
P. c. var. domensis, House Range primrose, is endemic to Utah.
P. c. var. maguirei (syn. Primula maguirei), Maguire's primrose, is a federally listed threatened species known only from one canyon in Cache County, Utah.
P. c. var. nevadensis, Nevada primrose, is endemic to Nevada.

References

External links
USDA Plants Profile

capillaris